The Journal of Clinical Neurophysiology is a bimonthly peer-reviewed medical journal covering clinical neurophysiology. It was established in 1984. It is the official journal of the American Clinical Neurophysiology Society (previously the American Electroencephalographic Society). It is published by Lippincott Williams & Wilkins and the editor-in-chief is Aatif M. Husain (Duke University).

Abstracting and indexing
The journal is abstracted and indexed in:

According to the Journal Citation Reports, the journal has a 2020 impact factor of 2.177, ranking it 159 out of 208 journals in the category "Clinical Neurology" and 223 out of 273 journals in the category "Neurosciences".

References

External links

American Clinical Neurophysiology Society

Neuroscience journals
Lippincott Williams & Wilkins academic journals
Publications established in 1984
English-language journals
Bimonthly journals